Bursaria tenuifolia is a species of flowering plant in the family Pittosporaceae and is endemic to north-eastern Queensland. It is a shrub or spindly tree with elliptic to rhombic adult leaves, spiny foliage when young, flowers with five whitish petals, and slightly flattened, papery fruit.

Description
The young growth is armed with spines, the edges of leaves with teeth or lobes.

Taxonomy
Bursaria tenuifolia was first formally described in 1899 by Frederick Manson Bailey in his book The Queensland Flora. The specific epithet (tenuifolia) means "narrow-leaved".

Distribution and habitat

References

tenuifolia
Pittosporaceae
Plants described in 1899
Flora of Queensland
Taxa named by Frederick Manson Bailey